Webster Methodist Church is an historic Methodist church located on NC 116 / Main St., at Webster, Jackson County, North Carolina. It was built in 1887, and is a one-story, three bay, rectangular Vernacular Gothic Revival style frame church.  It is sheathed in weatherboard, has a front gable roof, and engaged bell tower.

In 1989 it was added to the National Register of Historic Places. Congressman David McKee Hall is buried in the church cemetery.

Current use
The building was built as the Methodist Church building of the town of Webster, North Carolina in 1887, and still serves as a church.  It was renovated in 1960 and 2000.  It sits on the old Main Street of Webster next to the Webster Rock School, on the hill on which the downtown area of Webster was once located. It was built when Webster was a thriving town with a Courthouse, many businesses, homes, and people.  Today Webster is a quiet residential area with two churches, a cemetery, older Victorian homes, 1920s-1950s homes, newer homes, and an old rock WPA Schoolhouse. The current congregation meets on Sundays at 9:30 a.m.

See also
National Register of Historic Places listings in Jackson County, North Carolina

References

Churches on the National Register of Historic Places in North Carolina
Gothic Revival architecture in North Carolina
Churches in Jackson County, North Carolina
Churches completed in 1887
19th-century Methodist church buildings in the United States
National Register of Historic Places in Jackson County, North Carolina